Ryszard Jankowski (born 10 April 1960) is a retired Polish footballer (goalkeeper). He spent most of his career in Lech Poznań. He played also for Trelleborgs FF. After the season 1995-96 he finished his football career.

Honours

Club
Lech Poznań
 Ekstraklasa: 1990
 Polish Cup: 1983-84, 1987-88
 Polish SuperCup: 1990

References

External links 
 

Living people
1960 births
Polish footballers
Poland international footballers
Ekstraklasa players
Allsvenskan players
Warta Poznań players
Lech Poznań players
Trelleborgs FF players
Górnik Konin players
Polish expatriate footballers
Expatriate footballers in Sweden
Footballers from Poznań
Association football goalkeepers